Rathbeg may refer to:
Rathbeg, County Antrim, a townland in County Antrim, Northern Ireland
Rathbeg, County Tipperary, a townland in County Tipperary, Ireland